David Knevel (born October 18, 1994) is a professional Canadian football offensive lineman for the BC Lions of the Canadian Football League (CFL).

College career
After using a redshirt season in 2013, Knevel played college football for the Nebraska Cornhuskers from 2014 to 2017.

Professional career
Knevel was selected in the third round and 21st overall by the BC Lions in the 2018 CFL Draft and signed with the team on May 19, 2018. He then played in his first career game on July 7, 2018, against the Winnipeg Blue Bombers. In his rookie year, he dressed in 16 regular season games as a back-up offensive lineman.

In his second year, in 2019, Knevel played in three games and made his first career start, at left tackle, in the final game of the season on November 2, 2019, against the Calgary Stampeders. He spent the remainder of the year on the reserve roster and injured list. He did not play in 2020 due to the cancellation of the 2020 CFL season.

As a pending free agent entering the 2021, Knevel re-signed with the Lions on January 28, 2021. He then dressed in all 14 regular season games in a pandemic-shortened season. Following the season, he re-signed with the Lions on December 16, 2021.

References

External links
BC Lions bio

1994 births
Living people
American football offensive linemen
BC Lions players
Canadian football offensive linemen
Nebraska Cornhuskers football players
Players of Canadian football from Ontario
Sportspeople from Brantford